The Dwikora Cabinet,, was the 21st Indonesian cabinet. President Sukarno reshuffled the previous cabinet on 27 August 1964 to produce a cabinet better able to implement the government policy he had announced in his Independence Day speech entitled "the Year of Living Dangerously". The cabinet was appointed on 2 September  and served for a year and five months before being reshuffled on 21 February 1966.

Composition

Cabinet Leadership
President/Prime Minister/Supreme Commander of Indonesian National Armed Forces/Mandatary of the Provisional People's Consultative Assembly (MPRS)/Great Leader of the Revolution: Sukarno

Presidium
First Deputy Prime Minister: Subandrio
Second Deputy Prime Minister: Johannes Leimena
Third Deputy Prime Minister: Chairul Saleh

State Ministers Assigned to the Presidium
State Minister: Oei Tjoe Tat
State Minister: Njoto
State Minister: Arifin Harahap
State Minister: Police Brig. Gen. Mudjoko
State Minister: Police Comm. Boegie Soepeno
State Minister: Brig. Gen. Sukendro
State Minister: Air Vice Marshal Sri Muljono Herlambang
State Minister: Ibnu Sutowo
State Minister: Aminuddin Azis

Ministers with the Status of Coordinating Ministers
Minister of National Development Planning: Suharto
Minister/Chairman of the Supreme Audit Agency: Sultan Hamengkubuwono IX

Foreign and Foreign Economic Relations Section
Coordinating Minister: Subandrio
Minister of Foreign Affairs and Foreign Economic Relations: Subandrio

Justice and Home Affairs Section
Coordinating Minister: Wirjono Prodjodikoro
Minister of Home Affairs: Sumarno Sosroatmodjo
Minister of Justice: Achmad Astrawinata
Minister/Chief Justice of the Supreme Court of Indonesia: Wirjono Prodjodikoro
Minister/Attorney General: Brig. Gen. Sutardhio

Defense and Security Section
Coordinating Minister/Chief-of-Staff of the Armed Forces: Gen. Abdul Haris Nasution
Minister/Commander of the Army: Maj. Gen. Ahmad Yani (died in office as a result of the 30 September Movement coup attempt, October 1,1965)
Minister/Commander of the Navy: Rear Admiral R. E. Martadinata
Minister/Commander of the Air Force: Air Marshal Omar Dani (forced to resign as a result of the 30 September Movement coup attempt, November 27,1965)
Minister/Chief of the National Police: Insp. Gen. Soetjipto Judodihardjo

Finance Section
Coordinating Minister: Sumarno
Minister of State Revenue: Police Brig. Gen. Hugeng Imam Santoso
Minister of State Budget Affairs: Surjadi
Minister of Central Bank Affairs: Jusuf Muda Dalam
Minister of Insurance: Sutjipto S. Amidharmo

Development Section
Coordinating Minister: Chairul Saleh
Minister of Labor: Sutomo Martopradoto
Minister of National Research: Soedjono Djuned Pusponegoro
Minister of Public Works and Power: Maj. Gen. Suprajogi
Minister of People's Industry: Maj. Gen. Azis Saleh
Minister of Veterans' Affairs and Demobilization: Maj. Gen. Sarbini
Minister of Basic Industries and Mining: Chairul Saleh
State Minister Assigned to the Development Section: Ahem Erningpradja

Agriculture and Agrarian Affairs Section
Coordinating Minister: Sadjarwo
Minister of Agriculture: Sadjarwo
Minister of Plantations: Frans Seda
Minister of Forestry: Sudiarwo
Minister of Fisheries: Commodore Hamzah Atmohandojo
Minister of Agrarian Affairs: Rudolf Hermanses
Minister of the Development of Villagers: Ipik Gandamana

Distribution Section
Coordinating Minister: Johannes Leimena
Minister of Trade: Adam Malik
Minister of Land Transportation and Post, Telecommunications and Tourism: Lt. Gen. Hidajat
Minister of Maritime Transportation: Brig. Gen. Ali Sadikin
Minister of Air Transportation: Col. R. Iskander
Minister of Transmigration/ Cooperatives: Achadi

Welfare Section
Coordinating Minister: Muljadi Djojomartono
Minister of Religious Affairs: Sjaifuddin Zuchri
Minister of Social Affairs: Rusiah Sardjono
Minister of Health: Maj. Gen. Dr. Satrio
Minister of Relations with Religious Scholars: Fatah Jasin

Education/Culture Section
Coordinating Minister : Prijono
Minister of Basic Education & Culture: Artati Marzuki Sudirdjo
Minister of Higher Education & Science: Brig. Gen. Sjarif Thajeb
Minister of Sport: Maladi

Relations with the People Section
Coordinating Minister: Ruslan Abdulgani
Minister of Information: Maj. Gen. Achmadi
Minister of Relations with the People's Representative Council/People's Consultative Assembly/Supreme Advisory Council/National Planning Agency: W. J. Rumambi
Minister/Secretary General of the National Front: Sudibjo

Presidential Advisory State Ministers
Presidential/Prime Ministerial Advisory Minister of Funds and Forces: Notohamiiprodjo
State Minister Assigned to the President: Iwa Kusumasumantri
Minister and Military Adviser to the Indonesian President: Lt. Gen. S. Surjadarma
Domestic Security Adviser to the Indonesian President: Police Gen.  Sukarno Djojonegoro

Officials with the Status of Coordinating Ministers
Speaker of the People's Representative Council: Arudji Kartawinata
First Deputy Chairman of the Supreme Advisory Council: Sartono
Deputy Chairman of the Provisional People's Consultative Assembly: Ali Sastroamidjojo
Deputy Chairman of the Provisional People's Consultative Assembly: Idham Chalid
Deputy Chairman of the Provisional People's Consultative Assembly: Dipa Nusantara Aidit
Deputy Chairman of the Provisional People's Consultative Assembly: Brig. Gen. Wilujo Puspojudo

Officials with Ministerial status
State Secretary: Mohammad Ichsan
Cabinet Presidium Secretary: Abdul Wahab Surjoadiningrat
Deputy Speaker of the Mutual Assistance People's Representative Council: I. G. G. Subamia
Deputy Speaker of the Mutual Assistance People's Representative Council: M. H. Lukman
Deputy Speaker of the Mutual Assistance People's Representative Council: Mursalin Daeng Mamangung
Deputy Speaker of the Mutual Assistance People's Representative Council: Achmad Sjaichu

Cabinet reshuffling changes 
As a result of the aftermath of the 30 September Movement coup attempt of 1965 in which Minister/Commander of the Army Ahmad Yani died along with 5 other top Army general officers, Sukarno appointed Maj. Gen. Pranoto Reksosamodra to the by then vacant post of Minister/Commander of the Army on October 3, 1965. His term ended on October 14 the same year, when Maj. Gen. Suharto, then the commander of Kostrad, was appointed to the post with effect the same day.

On November 27, Air Marshal Omar Dani, due to pressure from many in the armed forces for his role in the coup attempt, resigned. His post as Minister/Commander of the Air Force was taken over by Air Vice Marshal Sri Mulyono Herlambang who was appointed to succeed him the same day.

References
 
 

Cabinets of Indonesia
1964 establishments in Indonesia
1966 disestablishments in Indonesia
Cabinets established in 1964
Cabinets disestablished in 1966